Chorthippus apicalis is a species of slant-faced grasshopper in the family Acrididae, found on the Iberian Peninsula.

Subspecies
These subspecies belong to the species Chorthippus apicalis:
 Chorthippus apicalis abbreviatus (Bolívar, 1914)
 Chorthippus apicalis apicalis (Herrich-Schäffer, 1840)

References

Further reading

External links

 

apicalis